Fulidhoo (Dhivehi:ފުލިދޫ) is the most northern of the inhabited islands of Vaavu Atoll in the Maldives. It is famous for Maldivian cultural events like Langiri, a traditional dance with drums and Thaara.

Geography
Fulidhoo is one of the islands of the Vaavu Atoll. The island has a large lagoon, which is used as a natural harbour.

Demography

Economy
In 2012, Fulidhoo had two fishing vessels. The majority of the catch was of fish from the Lutjanidae (snappers) and Carangidae (jacks) families.

Healthcare
Fulidhoo has a health center and a pharmacy.

References

Islands of the Maldives